Cerynea fissilinea is a species of moth in the family Erebidae first described by George Hampson in 1910. It is found in Madagascar.

References 

Boletobiinae
Moths of Madagascar
Moths of Africa